Knockout Kings 2000 (known as Box Champions 2000 in Europe for the Nintendo 64) is a video game developed by Black Ops Entertainment and published by EA Sports for Nintendo 64, PlayStation, and Game Boy Color (the latter as simply Knockout Kings) in 1999.

Gameplay
Knockout Kings 2000 features 25 fighters, including Muhammad Ali and Sugar Ray Leonard, and includes the ability to create a custom boxer.

A pound for pound boxing arcade style where players can play any of these three modes: Championship, Slugfest, and Training. The "Super Punch" is used where players can instantly knock down his opponent to the floor.

Reception

The PlayStation version received favorable reviews, and the Nintendo 64 version received mixed reviews, while the Game Boy Color version received unfavorable reviews, according to the review aggregation website GameRankings. Adam Pavlacka of NextGen said that the former console version's "biggest strength lies in its realism. The lack of arcade play is going to turn off a lot of potential fans."

In one review, Air Hendrix of GamePro called the Nintendo 64 version "a true title contender that every N64 gamer should check out." In another, however, he changed his tune and said of the same console version, "There's a lot of flash and name recognition going on here, but this fighter doesn't have the iron will necessary to be a true champion." He later said of the PlayStation version in one review, "If you're looking for a PlayStation boxing match, there's no better bout in town – with its improved in-depth features and controls, it even beats out its N64 counterpart and the Dreamcast's glamorous Ready 2 Rumble. It's no contest; KO Kings rules the console boxing ring." The Burn Out said in another review that the PlayStation version "achieves its goal of creating a realistic boxing experience that's better than the original. Die-hard boxing fans are sure to dig the massive list of moves and combos. If you liked the first Knockout Kings, you'll definitely enjoy this one as well. But if you're looking for a game like Ready 2 Rumble, then you're stepping into the wrong ring."

The PlayStation version was a runner-up for "9th Annual GamePro Readers' Choice Awards" for "Best Boxing Game", which went to Ready 2 Rumble Boxing for Dreamcast. Said console version did, however, win the award for "Sports Game of the Year" at the Academy of Interactive Arts & Sciences' 3rd Annual Interactive Achievement Awards.

Notes

References

External links
 
 

1999 video games
Black Ops Entertainment games
Boxing video games
D.I.C.E. Award for Sports Game of the Year winners
Game Boy Color games
Multiplayer and single-player video games
Nintendo 64 games
PlayStation (console) games
Video games developed in the United States
Video games scored by Burke Trieschmann